International Christian Quality Music Secondary and Primary School ( ICQM) is the first music school in Hong Kong. It is situated in 183 Po Kong Village Road, Diamond Hill, Kowloon.

ICQM has a concert hall (the Jehovahjireh Concert Hall), two chapels, 40 music rooms. There is an electronic music studio and 2 computer rooms.

Jehovahjireh Concert Hall
The concert hall's architect was Joseph Ho of Hsin Yieh Architects and the acoustician was Prof. Ir. Dr. James Wing Ho Wong, the President of Allied Acoustics, Allied Environmental Consultants Limited, he brought the first adjustable acoustics reverberation chambers auditorium design to Hong Kong. The Jehovahjireh Concert Hall, with 798 seats and incorporated sacred geometry, boasts superb acoustics. The hall has an acoustic canopy which adapts the hall for different musical performances.

There are 1029 students.

Notable alumni
 Joseph Ng Kwok Chung – participated in the last HKALE and got 3A, 1C at the age of only 14.
 Wong Ji-yuet – activist and politician

References

External links
 

Protestant secondary schools in Hong Kong
Primary schools in Hong Kong
Tsz Wan Shan